Simon Mawhinney (born 1976) is a Northern Irish composer. His music has been performed in the UK, Ireland, Germany, France, and Iceland, and has won prizes including the Royal Philharmonic Society Composition Prize.

Early life and education 
Mawhinney was born in County Down, Northern Ireland in 1976. As a student, he studied music at the University of Oxford, the University of York and Queen's University Belfast, the latter of which he has held the position of senior lecturer in composition since 2006.

Musical career 
Throughout his musical career, Mawhinney has used a range of compositional techniques, drawing on the post-spectral and New Complexity movements. He has also been interested in computer-assisted composition, specifically using OpenMusic, a software developed by the French company IRCAM.

Mawhinney draws particular inspiration from the music of Olivier Messiaen and Pierre Boulez, stating that Boulez's Dérive 2 is a pinnacle of contemporary music. He has also been influenced by the works of Kaikhosru Sorabji.
He has a particular interest in music with extended duration, with inspiration from composers such as Morton Feldman. In 2009, he said about his composition Hunshigo that he felt all of his compositional work was, in some way, a response to The Troubles in Northern Ireland. He said:

However, no specific work sets out to make explicit reference. Rather, I have sought in my work to consider underlying sources of conflict (which I would term duality in order to apply it universally) and to come up with solutions as to how it is prevented. I have sought to inculcate my optimistic/idealistic world view throughout the structure of my work. Hunshigo [for violin and piano] is as good an example as any of mine in which the resulting musical language reflects my response. I really cannot envisage writing any other way to achieve this.

Selected works 
Mawhinney's works include:

 Hunshigo (2009) - for violin and piano
 Nendrum Haykal (2006) - for viola d'amore
 Starbog (2006) - for chamber ensemble
 Batu (2005) - for piano
 Trumpet Sketches (2004) - for trumpet
 Darby's Loanin (2003) - for chamber ensemble
 Asháb (2003) - for symphony orchestra
 Barcode 3 (2003) - for violin
 Barcode (2003) - for trumpet
 Barcode 2 (2002) - for flute and clarinet
 The Pot of Pulgarve (2003) - for symphony orchestra
 Qalban Tahiran (2001) - for voice and chamber ensemble
 Lavander (2000) - for clarinet and large ensemble
 Namas (1999) - for large ensemble

Bibliography

External links 
 
 

Composers from Northern Ireland
Musicians from County Down
Living people
1976 births